San Ignacio ("Beyu") is one of nine parishes (administrative divisions) in Ponga, a municipality within the province and autonomous community of Asturias, in northern Spain.

The population is 39 (INE 2011).

Culture
Its specialty is the cheese, Queso de Beyos.

Parishes in Ponga